Fidanka Saparefska  (born ) is a retired Greek female volleyball player, who played as a middle blocker. She was part of the Greece women's national volleyball team at the 2001 Women's European Volleyball Championship and 2002 FIVB Volleyball Women's World Championship in Germany. On club level she played with Panathinaikos Athen.

Clubs
 Panathinaikos Athen (2002)

References

1975 births
Living people
Greek women's volleyball players
Place of birth missing (living people)